Alec Butler (born Audrey Butler; 1959) is a Canadian playwright and filmmaker.

Life and career 
Butler was born in 1959, and is two-spirit, non-binary and intersex. Butler uses they/them and he/him pronouns. Assigned female at birth, he initially presented as a butch lesbian before coming out as transgender the late 1990s. Before he came out, his work was published under his birth name.

He was a nominee for the Governor General's Award for English-language drama in 1990 for his play Black Friday. He has also worked on artistic projects with The 519 Church St. Community Centre as their first artist-in-residence. He was named one of Toronto's Vital People by the Toronto Community Foundation in 2006.

He identifies as having Miꞌkmaq heritage.

Plays

 Shakedown
 Cradle Pin
 Radical Perversions: 2 Dyke Plays (1990)
 Black Friday (1990)
 Claposis (1990)
 Hardcore Memories (1993)
 Medusa Rising (1996)
 Trans Cab (2005)

Books:
 Radical Perversions: two Dyke Plays by Audrey Butler published by Women's Press, 1991
 Novella called Rough Paradise published May 31, 2014 by Quattro Books

Films

 Trans Mission: Get Yer Motor Runnin' – One-man show at A-Space, Toronto, 2003.
 Misadventures of PussyBoy: First Love / Sick / First Period – Screened at many queer film and video festivals, First Love won the Charles Street Award for emerging video and film makers in 2002 at the InsideOut Festival.
 Audrey's Beard – Named one of the top ten films about transitioning by Curve magazine.
 5 Seconds of Fame – Commissioned by Toronto's Pride Committee for Pride Toronto, 2007.
 My Friend, Brindley – Works in progress; experimental doc about human rights activist and painter, Kathleen Brindley.
 Darla's Goodbye – Short film based on a short story of the same name published in Red Light: Superheroes, Saints and Sluts.
 Trans Cabaret: The Video

References

1959 births
20th-century Canadian dramatists and playwrights
21st-century Canadian dramatists and playwrights
Film directors from Nova Scotia
Canadian LGBT dramatists and playwrights
Living people
Canadian non-binary writers
Intersex non-binary people
Writers from Nova Scotia
21st-century Canadian LGBT people
Non-binary dramatists and playwrights